Louis Gouin (September 27, 1756 – September 1, 1814) was a seigneur and political figure in Lower Canada. He represented Buckinghamshire in the Legislative Assembly of Lower Canada from 1800 to 1804.

Biography
Gouin was born Louis-Joseph Gouin in Sainte-Anne-de-la-Pérade, Quebec, the son of Louis Gouin and Marie-Thérèse Lanouette. Gouin was a captain in the militia, later reaching the rank of major. In 1789, he established himself as a merchant at Baie-du-Febvre, Quebec. He also owned a mill there. Gouin did not run for reelection in 1804. He purchased the seigneury of Courval in 1804 and part of the seigneury of Saint-François in 1806. In 1809, Gouin was named a school commissioner. He was married twice: to his cousin Marie-Élisabeth Gouin in 1776 and then to Catherine Rousseau in 1780. He died in Baie-du-Febvre at the age of 57.

References 

 

1756 births
1814 deaths
Members of the Legislative Assembly of Lower Canada